Wedding ducks are a pair of duck carvings (traditionally Mandarin ducks) that are used in Korean wedding ceremonies, and often given as marriage gifts. Mandarin ducks are chosen because it is believed that, unlike other types of ducks, they mate for life, and that if one of the pair dies, the other will mourn. For Koreans, Mandarin ducks represent peace, fidelity, and plentiful offspring.

History and carving 
Originally, a man who wished to marry would purchase pairs of live ducks or geese to give as a gift to the family of the prospective bride. That tradition gave way to using wooden ducks in place of live animals. A couple would select a man to carve their wedding ducks who was honourable, and a good friend. Additionally, the man should have "five fortunes" to be a suitable carver because it was believed that these fortunes would be imparted to the ducks and transferred to the couple who received them. The five fortunes of the carver are that he should:

 Be wealthy.
 Be in good health.
 Have a good wife.
 Not have been divorced, nor should he have relatives who have been divorced.
 Have many sons.

The fifth fortune about the sons is consistent with the Confucian emphasis on family strength and proliferation. This fortune also indicates that the man must maintain a good relationship with all of his sons. If the man has many children, but only two of these are with him when he dies, he can only say he has two children.

While carving, the man would pray for happiness, peace, prosperity, and abundant offspring. The carver would do the work for free because it was considered an honor to be asked to carve wedding ducks. He should also not carve more than one set of ducks in his lifetime because with each carving he shares some of his five fortunes.

Modern day 

Modern wedding ducks are most often mass-produced. Female ducks are usually red, the males blue. The female duck may have a ribbon tied around her beak as a sign that the wife should be quiet and support her husband. It is also common to see a ribbon around both ducks' beaks signifying that silence is a virtue. Wedding ducks are often purchased as souvenirs by tourists and can be found for sale at most tourist attractions in South Korea.

Wedding ceremony 
Wedding ducks are not commonplace at weddings today, although they may be included in more traditional ceremonies. If they are included, before the ceremony begins, the ducks are wrapped in cloth leaving only the necks and heads exposed. When the bride arrives, the wrapped ducks are placed on a table where the ceremony will take place. 

After the wedding, the ducks are displayed prominently somewhere in the couple's home. If there is harmony between the husband and wife, then the ducks are oriented facing each other, bill to bill. If the couple is arguing, they may turn one or both ducks so that they are facing away from each other. The ducks are commonly handed down as gifts from mother to daughter.

See also 

 Culture of Korea

References 

Wedding objects
Wedding traditions
Korean culture